Schulze is a German surname, from the medieval office of Schulze, or village official. Notable people with the surname include:

 Andrew Schulze (1896–1982), clergyman and civil rights activist
 William August Schulze, rocket scientist recruited in 1945 by Operation Paperclip
 Edmund Schulze (1824–1878), German organ builder, or four previous generations of his family in the same profession
 Ernst Schulze (1789–1817), German poet
 Ernst Schulze (chemist) (1840-1912), German biochemist and grandson of Gottlob Ernst Schulze
 Horst Schulze, founder of The Ritz-Carlton Hotel Company 
 Frank Schulze (born 1970), German footballer
 Franz Hermann Schulze-Delitzsch (1808–1883), German economist
 Franz Eilhard Schulze (1840–1921), German anatomist and zoologist 
 Friedrich August Schulze (1770–1849), German novelist
 Gottlob Ernst Schulze (1761–1833), German professor and philosopher
 Hans-Joachim Schulze (born 1934), German Bach scholar
Harro Schulze-Boysen (1909-1942), left-wing German publicist, Luftwaffe officer, and anti-fascist resistance fighter
 Johann Heinrich Schulze (1687–1744), German academic, inventor of a primitive photogram
 John Andrew Shulze (1774–1852), Pennsylvania politician and governor
 Klaus Schulze (1947-2022), German musician
 Klaus-Peter Schulze (born 1954), German politician
 Lara Schulze (born 2002), German chess master
 Paul Schulze (1887-1949), German zoologist and tick taxonomist
 Richard Schulze (disambiguation)
 Willibald Schulze, German writer

See also
 Schulze method, a single-winner election method
 Schulze STV, a method of proportional representation by the single transferable vote
 Müller-Schulze Gambit, a chess gambit
 Schulze Baking Company Plant

German-language surnames